The third series of Dani's Castle aired from 7 July 2015 to 22 September 2015, and then returned on 15 December 2015 for a finale Christmas episode on the CBBC Channel. Dani Harmer did not return as Dani, therefore the show was informally known as Rich Jimmy & Kait's Castle. The new series introduced two new characters, Clare played by Jessica Forrest and Leonie played by Lucy Hutchinson. Jordan Brown made her last regular appearance as Esme in "The Ghostel", and then reappeared, although not in person, in "That Sinking Feeling", "Ghost Swappers" and "Midsummer Night's Nightmare", she reappeared in person in "It's A Wonderful Afterlife". Kieran Alleyne was absent in "Truth or Scare", "Ghost Swappers", "An Inspector Calls" and "Groundbog Day". He returned in "Midsummer Night's Nightmare" following his brief absence. In "Choc Horror", Jordan Brown reappeared but did not play Esme, instead playing Elly, a relative of Jimmy, Rich and Dylan. Episode 13, titled "It's A Wonderful Afterlife", was a Christmas Special. This was the final series.

Cast

Main Cast
 Richard Wisker as Rich
 Shannon Flynn as Kait
 Niall Wright as Gabe
Kieran Alleyne as Jimmy
 Toby Murray as Dylan
 Jessica Forrest as Clare
 Lucy Hutchinson as Leonie

Supporting Cast
 Shannon Flynn as Roxy
 Niall Wright as Carlos

Recurring Cast
 Jordan Brown as Esme

Episodes

Notes

References

2015 British television seasons
series 3